Andy Schwartz (born September 26, 1950) is an American politician and a Democratic former member of the Wyoming House of Representatives representing District 23 from January 5, 2015 until January 10, 2023.

Elections

2014
After incumbent Republican Representative Keith Gingery announced his retirement, Schwartz announced his candidacy and ran unopposed in the Democratic primary. He faced Republican candidate Jim Darwiche in the general election and defeated Darwiche, 56% to 44%.  Schwartz's win was one of three Democratic pickups in the state, as Democrats gained seats in the legislature.

2016
Schwartz ran unopposed in both the Democratic primary and the general election.

References

External links
Official page at the Wyoming Legislature
Profile from Ballotpedia

Living people
Democratic Party members of the Wyoming House of Representatives
Oberlin College alumni
Politicians from Washington, D.C.
People from Jackson Hole, Wyoming
1950 births
Businesspeople from Wyoming
21st-century American politicians